Stavros Velkopoulos (born 1910, date of death unknown) was a Greek middle-distance runner. He competed in the men's 800 metres at the 1936 Summer Olympics.

References

External links
 

1910 births
Year of death missing
Athletes (track and field) at the 1936 Summer Olympics
Greek male middle-distance runners
Olympic athletes of Greece
Place of birth missing